Dana Šafka Brožková (born 28 April 1981 in Rovensko pod Troskami) is a Czech orienteering competitor. She is the 2008 World Champion in the long distance and 2009 World Champion in the middle distance. She received a bronze medal in the long distance at the 2006 World Orienteering Championships in Aarhus. She is Junior World Champion from 2001, when she won the classic distance.

Her sister Radka has also represented the Czech national orienteering team.

See also
 Czech orienteers
 List of orienteers
 List of orienteering events

References

External links
 
 

1981 births
Living people
People from Semily District
Czech orienteers
Female orienteers
Foot orienteers
World Orienteering Championships medalists
Competitors at the 2009 World Games
Competitors at the 2005 World Games
Junior World Orienteering Championships medalists